Filip Veger (born 21 December 1994, in Slatina) is a Croatian tennis coach and former professional tennis player.

Career
Veger made his ATP main draw debut at the 2013 PBZ Zagreb Indoors where he came through qualifying defeating Simon Greul, Kamil Čapkovič and Ante Pavić. He lost in the first round to Lukáš Rosol, 6–2, 6–4.

As a singles player, Veger reached a career high of 478 in February 2015. He had some success as a junior, reaching a highest ranking of 52 in singles and was also a finalist in the 2012 Australian Open Boys' Doubles alongside Adam Pavlásek, losing to the British pair of Liam Broady and Joshua Ward-Hibbert.

Personal
Veger studied at Durham University from 2017 to 2018, also playing for and coaching the men's tennis team. He was the 2018 BUCS singles champion.

He currently coaches with the Qatar Tennis Federation.

Junior Grand Slam finals

Doubles: 1 (1 runner-up)

ATP Challenger and ITF Futures finals

Singles: 4 (0–4)

Doubles: 4 (2–2)

External links

References

1994 births
Living people
Croatian male tennis players
People from Slatina, Croatia
Alumni of Durham University